A. V. Aryan (died 1 February 2007) was a Communist Party of India (Marxist) politician from Thrissur and Member of the Legislative Assembly from Ollur Assembly Constituency in 1967.

References

Malayali politicians
Kerala politicians
Politicians from Thrissur
Year of birth missing
2007 deaths
Communist Party of India (Marxist) politicians from Kerala
Kerala MLAs 1967–1970
Kerala MLAs 1970–1977